Matthew Francis Dean Reynolds (born 21 July 1992) is a Welsh former professional darts player.

Career
Reynolds' first Development Tour title came in 2014 by defeating Max Hopp 4–2. He also won the 16th event by edging past Josh Payne 4–3. Reynolds beat Ryan de Vreede 5–4 to claim the 2015 French Open title. He also took another Development Tour event with a 4–2 victory over Mike de Decker.

In 2016, Reynolds enjoyed a breakthrough year. He qualified for the 2016 BDO World Championship and lost 3–0 to Glen Durrant. At the BDO World Trophy, he defeated Dave Cameron, Martin Adams and Danny Noppert before losing 11–9 to Peter Machin in the semi-finals. He had six tournament wins on the PDC Development Tour during the year guaranteeing him a PDC Tour Card for 2017 and 2018, but he later decided to remain in the BDO and his tour card was passed down to the next highest player on the Order Of Merit. He hit a nine-dart finish at the BDO England Masters in September before losing in the quarter-finals to Durrant. Two days later though, he triumphed in the England Classi, defeating Scott Baker 6–3 in the final.

In the 2017 World Championship he lost 3–2 to Pip Blackwell after being 2–0 up in sets and he missed three darts to win 3–0.
Afterwards, Reynolds announced on social media that he rejected his PDC Tour Card for 2017 to improve his consistency on stage. This meant that Reynolds would concentrate on BDO tournaments in 2017.

2019
Since 8 August, he has not participated in any darts event.

World Championship results

BDO
 2016: 1st Round  (lost to Glen Durrant 0–3)
 2017: 1st Round (lost to Pip Blackwell 2–3)
 2018: 2nd Round (lost to Scott Waites 2–4)
 2019: 2nd Round (lost to Jim Williams 0–4)

Performance timeline

References

External links
 Dean Reynolds on Darts Database

Living people
Welsh darts players
British Darts Organisation players
1992 births